The Main Event is a professional wrestling television program that was produced by the World Wrestling Federation (WWF). There were five shows between 1988 and 1991. Only the first three The Main Event episodes were shown live on NBC. The final two were taped and then shown on NBC at a later date. It included mainly high-card wrestlers of the WWF including Hulk Hogan, André the Giant, "Macho Man" Randy Savage, The Ultimate Warrior and "Million Dollar Man" Ted DiBiase.

It was a spin-off of Saturday Night's Main Event and aired on NBC on Friday nights during prime time. All episodes of The Main Event are available on the WWE Network, included with Saturday Night's Main Event.

Dates and venues

Results

The Main Event

The Main Event (1988) took place and aired live on Friday February 5, 1988 at 8pm ET from the Market Square Arena in Indianapolis, Indiana. The live broadcast drew a 15.2 Nielsen rating and 33 million viewers, both records for American televised wrestling.

The match between André the Giant and Hulk Hogan saw André receive the pinfall victory despite Hogan's shoulders not being down. It was revealed post-match that the referee was not the assigned referee, Dave Hebner, but rather his twin brother, Earl Hebner, who was hired by Ted DiBiase as part of a storyline screwjob. After the match, André attempted to surrender the title to DiBiase. Then-WWF President Jack Tunney said the title could only change hands by pin or submission, and said that by attempting to surrender the title, André had actually vacated it. Following the vacancy, a single elimination tournament was held at WrestleMania IV to crown the new champion.

The Strike Force vs. The Hart Foundation match was still in progress when NBC signed off. In 2014, when the WWE Network uploaded this episode to its on-demand section, the ending of the match was added in.

The Main Event II

The Main Event II took place and aired live on Friday February 3, 1989 at 8pm ET from the Bradley Center in Milwaukee, Wisconsin. The live broadcast drew an 11.6 rating and 19.9 million viewers.

The slowly building tension between Hulk Hogan and "Macho Man" Randy Savage boiled over during the team's match against The Twin Towers, leading to the team's breakup upon Savage's heel turn when Savage contended that Hogan was lusting after his manager, Miss Elizabeth.

The Main Event III

The Main Event III took place and aired live on February 23, 1990 at 10pm ET from the Joe Louis Arena in Detroit, Michigan. The live broadcast drew a 12.8 rating and 20.9 million viewers.

Mike Tyson was originally scheduled to be the special guest referee, but this changed following Buster Douglas' knockout title win over Tyson just under two weeks before, on February 11. Tyson would eventually be the guest referee at WrestleMania XIV.

Tito Santana was a substitute for Jimmy Snuka.

The Main Event IV

The Main Event IV took place on October 30, 1990 from the Allen County War Memorial Coliseum in Fort Wayne, Indiana, and aired on Friday November 23, 1990 at 10pm ET. The broadcast drew an 8.6 rating and 15 million viewers.

The WWF Tag Team Championship match between The Hart Foundation and The Rockers was supposed to be on the show. The Rockers defended their newly won titles a few times before the WWF rehired Jim Neidhart, pairing him with Bret Hart once more, and quietly handing the belts back to The Hart Foundation, erasing The Rockers' reign from the history books. Retrospectively, the WWF explained that the title change had been revoked due to a ring rope malfunction during the second fall of the two-out-of-three falls match. The match can be seen unedited on the DVD The Shawn Michaels Story: Heartbreak & Triumph. Marty Jannetty pinned Bret Hart in the first fall with a sunset flip counter at 9:33. Hart pinned Shawn Michaels in the second fall with the Hart Attack at 19:23. Jannetty pinned Jim Neidhart in the third fall when Michaels dropkicked Jannetty onto Neidhart, who was setting up the Hart Attack at 25:41.

Nikolai Volkoff was scheduled to face Sgt. Slaughter on the show, but Slaughter attacked Nikolai before the opening bell rang and the match never took place.

The Main Event V

The Main Event V took place on January 28, 1991 from the Macon Coliseum in Macon, Georgia, and aired on Friday February 1, 1991 at 8pm ET.

KNBC, the NBC-owned-and-operated station in Los Angeles, did not air this program when it was shown by the network on February 1. That day, a collision took place at Los Angeles International Airport between a US Airways passenger jet and a SkyWest Airlines commuter plane. The crash occurred in the late afternoon, and KNBC opted to air news bulletin coverage of this story throughout the night. The station did replay the program unadvertised on a later date.

The broadcast drew 10.6 million viewers and a 6.7 rating, which was at the time the worst rating any WWF program had received on NBC despite the presence of Hulk Hogan. This has been blamed on the controversial and exploitative Sgt. Slaughter Iraqi sympathizer storyline that was on going at the time.

WWF President Jack Tunney declared Hulk Hogan the number one contender for Sgt. Slaughter's WWF Championship at WrestleMania VII.

References

External links

1988 American television series debuts
1991 American television series endings
NBC original programming
Main Event